is the railway station in Higashisonogi, Nagasaki Prefecture, Japan. It is operated by JR Kyushu and is on the Ōmura Line.

Lines
Besides the local services on the line, some trains of the Rapid Seaside Liner also stop at the station.

Station layout 
The station consists of a side platform serving a single track by the coast of Ōmura Bay. The station building was built in 1928 and is a timber building with a tiled roof of traditional Japanese design. A ramp leads up from the station forecourt to the building but another short flight of steps is needed to access the platform. Parking and a bike shed are available at the station forecourt.

The ticket window is not staffed by JR Kyushu but a kan'i itaku agent has converted the station waiting room into a cafe and also sells some kinds of tickets on site.

Adjacent stations

History
Japanese Government Railways (JGR) opened the station on 20 April 1928 as an additional station on what was then the Nagasaki Main Line. With the privatization of Japanese National Railways (JNR), the successor of JGR, on 1 April 1987, control of the station passed to JR Kyushu.

Passenger statistics
In fiscal 2014, there were a total of 29,848 boarding passengers, giving a daily average of 82 passengers.

See also
 List of railway stations in Japan

References

External links
Chiwata Station (JR Kyushu)

Railway stations in Nagasaki Prefecture
Railway stations in Japan opened in 1928
Ōmura Line